Hansel is one of the main characters in the fairy tale Hansel and Gretel. The German name Hänsel (meaning "little Hans") is a diminutive of the given name Hans.

Hansel may also refer to:

People

Given name
 Hansel Izquierdo (born 1977), Cuban baseball player
 Hansel Mieth (1909–1998), German photojournalist
 Hansel Robles (born 1990), Dominican baseball player
 Hansel Zapata (born 1995), Colombian footballer

Surname
 C. E. M. Hansel (1917–2011), British psychologist
 Deeann Hansel (born 1962), American tennis player
 Heike Hänsel (born 1966), German politician
 Howell Hansel (1860–1917), American film director
 Marion Hänsel (1949–2020), Belgian film director, producer, actress and screenwriter
 Peter Hänsel (1770–1831), German composer and violinist
 Phil Hansel (1925–2010), American swimming coach

Other uses
 Hansel Ltd., the central procurement unit of the Finnish government
 Hansel (horse), an American thoroughbred racehorse
 main character in the fairy tale Gambling Hansel
 Hansel, a fictional character in the 2001 film Zoolander, played by Owen Wilson
 Hansel, a village in Ayrshire, Scotland
 Hansel, a Filipino biscuit brand of Republic Biscuit Corporation

See also
 Hanzel (disambiguation), a given name and surname

German-language surnames
Surnames from given names